The Irene Villagers Cricket Club Ground is a first-class cricket ground at the Irene Country Club in Irene, south of Pretoria, South Africa.

The ground, on the bank of the Hennops River, has been the main home ground for the Irene Villagers Cricket Club since the club's inception in 1965. It has also been used for several non-first-class tournaments since 1998.

The Bangladesh A team played four minor matches there on their tour of South Africa and Zimbabwe in 2015-16.  A few weeks later the ground staged its first first-class and List A cricket matches, when Northerns played two home matches there against North West in December 2015. North West won both matches.

References

External links
Irene Villagers Cricket Club Ground at CricketArchive
Irene Country Club website
Aerial photograph of Irene Country Club grounds

Cricket grounds in South Africa
Sports venues in Gauteng
City of Tshwane Metropolitan Municipality